Fox Plaza (alternatively known as 20th Century Studios Plaza) is a 34-story,  skyscraper in Century City, Los Angeles, California. It is owned by the Orange County–based Irvine Company.

History 
Completed in 1987, the building's architects were Scott Johnson, Bill Fain, and William L. Pereira. Fox Plaza is the last building that Pereira designed before his death in 1985, and he did not live to see it open.

Former American President Ronald Reagan had his offices on the 34th floor of the building for several years after leaving public office. The 34th floor is now occupied by 20th Century Studios.

Design 

Outer exterior of the building contains rust-red granite and glass panels.

The Fox plaza building features a unique HVAC system where a large vertical air shaft is located in the core of the building. The air shaft begins below the building, as an outdoor, cooler air intake pushing air to each floor's fan room, and on the roof is located an exhaust for stale air. Such system design utilizes stack effect.

Filming location 
In a 2018 tour for Variety, the chief engineer of the building noted how the Fox Plaza has a large number of redundancies in its design, and he speculates that it's because it was intended to be used as a filming location.

The building has been featured in at least four major motion pictures released by Fox. In the film Die Hard it portrayed the fictional Nakatomi Plaza (also known as Nakatomi Tower), a building owned by a fictional Japanese conglomerate. The damaged version of the tower was made via a scale model special effect.

The plaza and a neighbouring building are the main setting for the 1994 comedy Airheads where fictional radio station KPPX is located. Fox Plaza was also one of the buildings brought down at the end of Fight Club. The building is also used for the corporate offices of Chimera Gas in the surrealistic road movie Motorama and is also portrayed as the headquarters for Spencer Publications on the soap opera The Bold and the Beautiful. The building plays an important role in the Brooklyn Nine-Nine episode "99", in which detective Jake Peralta insists on visiting the building due to its role in Die Hard and causes his squad to miss their return flight to New York City.

The exterior of the building was used in the 1987 Charlie Sheen film No Man's Land, in the 2001 episode of The X-Files, "Essence", and in the 1989 film Lethal Weapon 2.

See also
 Skyscrapers in film

References

External links
 Fox Plaza Century City at the Irvine Company

Skyscraper office buildings in Los Angeles
20th Century Studios
Mass media company headquarters in the United States
William Pereira buildings
Century City, Los Angeles
Office buildings completed in 1987
Die Hard